Sciastes is a genus of sheet weavers that was first described by S. C. Bishop & C. R. Crosby in 1938.

Species
 it contains seven species, found in Europe and Russia:
Sciastes carli (Lessert, 1907) – France, Italy, Switzerland, Austria
Sciastes dubius (Hackman, 1954) – Russia, Canada, USA
Sciastes extremus Holm, 1967 – Canada, Greenland
Sciastes hastatus Millidge, 1984 – USA, Canada
Sciastes mentasta (Chamberlin & Ivie, 1947) – Canada, USA (Alaska)
Sciastes tenna Chamberlin, 1949 – USA
Sciastes truncatus (Emerton, 1882) (type) – USA, Canada

See also
 List of Linyphiidae species (Q–Z)

References

Araneomorphae genera
Linyphiidae
Spiders of North America